Typhoon Dot, known in the Philippines as Typhoon Kuring, was one of several tropical cyclones to impact southern China and northern Vietnam during the 1989 Pacific typhoon season. Originating from a tropical disturbance near Palau on June 4, Dot tracked west-northwestward towards the Philippines. Crossing the country on June 6, the system moved over the South China Sea and attained typhoon status. The system weakened slightly the next day before making landfall in Hainan Island. A weakened storm then entered the Gulf of Tonkin before striking northern Vietnam and dissipating on June 12.

Throughout its course, Typhoon Dot produced heavy rains in the Philippines, China and Vietnam, resulting in significant damage and eight fatalities. The most severe impacts took place on Hainan Island where 1,400 homes were destroyed and another 60,000 were damaged. In Vietnam, Dot exacerbated flooding triggered in late May by Tropical Storm Cecil.

Meteorological history

In early June 1989, the Joint Typhoon Warning Center (JTWC) began monitoring a tropical disturbance that developed over the southern Philippine Sea. Over the following two days, convection associated with this system increased and became better organized. This development prompted the issuance of a Tropical Cyclone Formation Alert on June 4 as the system moved just north of Palau. By this time, the Japan Meteorological Agency (JMA) classified the system as a tropical depression. Due to the cyclone's proximity to the Philippines, the Philippine Atmospheric, Geophysical and Astronomical Services Administration also monitored the storm, assigning it with the local name Kuring. Tracking generally towards the west-northwest, the depression intensified into a Tropical Storm and was given the name Dot, 12 hours before making landfall in Samar on June 6.

Crossing over the central Philippines and the Sibuyan Sea, Tropical Storm Dot grew in size and intensity. By June 7, the storm entered the South China Sea and acquired a brief northerly component to its track. At the time, forecasters at the JTWC anticipated that Dot would interact with an approaching weather front and track north of Hainan Island. The front failed to materialize, however, and the storm resumed a west-northwesterly track. Owing to low wind shear and warm waters, Dot attained typhoon status on June 8.

Gradual weakening occurred as Dot neared Hainan Island on June 9. The typhoon subsequently made landfall near Sanya on June 10 and weakened to a tropical storm. Later that day, the storm emerged into the Gulf of Tonkin before making its third and final landfall near Hai Phong, Vietnam. Once onshore, Dot quickly degraded over the mountainous terrain of northern Vietnam, and was last noted on June 12.

Impact

Tropical Storm Dot produced widespread rainfall in the Philippines, leading to several landslides. In Toledo City, the Carmen copper Concentrator had to temporarily shut down after a landslide disrupted the facility's water supply.

Across Hainan Island, the storm produced heavy rains and damaging winds that left eight cities without power or telephone service. Throughout Hainan, about 1,400 homes were destroyed and 60,000 more were damaged. Press reports indicated that two people died as a result of Typhoon Dot while another was listed as missing. Overall, damage in Hainan reached 170 million Renminbi (US$45.1 million). Three rescue teams were deployed to the region to assist in recovery efforts. In nearby Guangxi Province, heavy rains caused additional flooding that destroyed 300 homes and injured eight people. However, these rains also helped alleviate drought conditions in the region.

Roughly two weeks after Tropical Storm Cecil devastated parts of Vietnam, Dot caused further flooding along the Red River Delta. Winds up to  reportedly affected coastal areas near where the typhoon moved ashore. Nearly  of rice fields were submerged by the storm. At least six fatalities were attributed to the storm in Vietnam, and many more were injured.

See also

Other tropical cyclones named Dot
Typhoon Angela (1989)
Typhoon Dan (1989)
Typhoon Elsie (1989)

Notes

References

External links

Japan Meteorological Agency
Joint Typhoon Warning Center 

1989 Pacific typhoon season
1989 disasters in the Philippines
Typhoons in the Philippines
Typhoons in China
Typhoons in Hong Kong
Typhoons in Vietnam
Typhoons